Perky may refer to:

Henry Perky (1843–1906), American lawyer, businessman
Kirtland I. Perky (1867–1939), American politician
Mary Cheves West Perky (1874–1940), American psychologist
Pinky and Perky, British children's television series